Mascot Madness! is the third book of the Schooling Around series by Andy Griffiths. It was published in 2009 by Pan Macmillan Australia.

Plot
Mr Brainfright dresses in a banana mascot suit to support Northwest Southeast Central School in the Northwest Interschool Sports Event, also getting extremely obsessed with bananas and boring the class - unusual for him!

Mr Brainfright also teaches the class to visualise all the events in the Northwest Interschool Sports Event, while Mr Grunt, their sports teacher, tortures them cruelly and gives 50 laps around the oval as punishment to those who fail.

Finally the event DOES come, and it is neck and neck between the two schools until Henry McThrottle has to replace Mr Brainfright in his banana suit, because Mr Brainfright has mascot madness. Henry is scared of it because he used to mascot for the Banana Emporium, and caused a car crash into the Emporium.  Fiona tells him it wasn't his fault - he wasn't in the official police report.

However, Northwest West Academy's mascot, a real pit bull terrier, attacks Henry and he starts running in the decathlon in desperation, also being caught up by Chomp occasionally.  They beat the speed record for all the events in the decathlon!

One judge ruled that Chomp added weight to Henry during the pole vaulting sport, therefore, Northwest Southeast win by one point! This ruined West's winning streak.

Mr Brainfright no longer has mascot madness, due to the absence of his banana-suit.  Mr Grunt becomes the sports teacher for Northwest West Academy, ensuring that Northwest West Academy do not win next year with Mr Brainfright replacing his job.  Fred and Clive, who told Mr Constrictor (NWW Academy's principal) about the banana-suit, do NOT get expelled.

The story ends with the chapter, with Mr Brainfright's Guide to Banana Mascotting.

Northwest West Academy

Northwest West Academy is a fictional school that has won forty-nine Northwest interschool sport events.  They are said to have a pro-bullying campaign instead of an anti-bullying campaign.  Their students are known to throw objects at people from Northwest Southeast Central School and call them "LOSERS".

Notable students and staff

Mr Constrictor
Karl "The Boa" Constrictor is a very strong wrestler and the principal of Northwest West Academy.  In fact, he appears in the 20-DVD box set of The Greatest Wrestlers in the History of the Entire World, and takes up 19 of them.  He was kicked out of the World Wrestling Federation because he attacked a referee.  He, however, claims that the referee attacked him.  He owns a pit bull terrier named Chomp, that is trained to attack bananas.  He cannot stand losing and usually threatens to squeeze people's heads in many different ways until it pops.  As his name suggests, he is a very good squeezer.  Does not like people insulting Chomp.

Chomp
Chomp is Mr Constrictor's pit bull terrier, trained to attack bananas of all shapes and sizes.  It is the meanest dog anyone in Northwest Southeast Central School knows.

Troy Gurgling
The school captain of Northwest West Academy.  Orders people on the Northwest West Academy bus to throw objects at Northwest Southeast Central Schoolers.  Found crying after Northwest West Academy lost the 50th Northwest interschool sport event.

50th Northwest Interschool sport event
They spent their time trying to discourage Northwest Southeast Central School by holding banners that insulted the school, such as "Go home losers!", "Northwest Southeast Central nincompoops!", "Greenbeard's gutless wonders!", and "Everybody hates Northwest Southeast Central school!"

The results were neck and neck until the last event, the decathlon, where Northwest Southeast Central Schooler Henry McThrottle ran all ten events, in a banana suit and chased by Chomp.  Northwest Southeast Central School won because of the extra weight of the pole vault.

2009 Australian novels
Pan Books books
Australian children's novels
2009 children's books
Novels set in high schools and secondary schools
Novels by Andy Griffiths